John Frederick McInerney (October 26, 1912 – October 25, 1967) was a physician and political figure in New Brunswick, Canada. He represented York County in the Legislative Assembly of New Brunswick as a Progressive Conservative member from 1952 to 1967.

He was born in Saint John, New Brunswick, the son of Frederick McInerney and Ethel Murphy. McInerney was educated at Saint Francis Xavier University and received an M.D. from McGill University in 1939. He set up practice in Fredericton. In 1942, he married Edith Vera Bedford. He served in the province's Executive Council as Minister of Health from 1952 to 1960. He was
also the deputy premier of New Brunswick under  Hugh John Fleming.  And
he was Doctor Chalmers partner in the starting the Polio Clinic & Health Center part of the Victoria Public Hospital in Fredericton. McInerney died suddenly in Fredericton the day before what would have been his 55th birthday.

References 
 Canadian Parliamentary Guide, 1963, PG Normandin
 Obituary, Canadian Journal of Anesthesia (pdf)

1912 births
1967 deaths
McGill University Faculty of Medicine alumni
Politicians from Saint John, New Brunswick
Progressive Conservative Party of New Brunswick MLAs